Bathophilus is a genus of barbeled dragonfishes native to the ocean depths of the Pacific, Atlantic and Indian oceans.

Species
There are currently 16 recognized species in this genus:
 Bathophilus abarbatus M. A. Barnett & Gibbs, 1968 (Barbless dragonfish)
 Bathophilus altipinnis Beebe, 1933
 Bathophilus ater (A. B. Brauer, 1902) (Winged dragonfish)
 Bathophilus brevis Regan & Trewavas, 1930
 Bathophilus digitatus (W. W. Welsh, 1923)
 Bathophilus filifer (Garman, 1899) (Sparing)
 Bathophilus flemingi Aron & McCrery, 1958 (Highfin dragonfish)
 Bathophilus indicus (A. B. Brauer, 1902)
 Bathophilus irregularis Norman, 1930
 Bathophilus kingi M. A. Barnett & Gibbs, 1968
 Bathophilus longipinnis (Pappenheim, 1914)
 Bathophilus nigerrimus Giglioli, 1882 (Scaleless dragonfish)
 Bathophilus pawneei A. E. Parr, 1927 (Pawnee dragonfish)
 Bathophilus proximus Regan & Trewavas, 1930
 Bathophilus schizochirus Regan & Trewavas, 1930
 Bathophilus vaillanti (Zugmayer, 1911)

References

Stomiidae
Marine fish genera
Taxa named by Enrico Hillyer Giglioli
Ray-finned fish genera